Trans-en-Provence (Provençal: Tranç) is a commune in the Var department in the Provence-Alpes-Côte d'Azur region in southeastern France.

Trans-en-Provence is famous among the ufologists as the site of an alleged UFO incident called the "Trans-en-Provence Case".

History
The village, which was originally located on St Victor's hill,  took the name Trans (Latin: "across") on moving across the river Nartuby. The name appears in 1004, in the proceedings of the cartulary of the Abbey of Saint Victor, Marseille. At the end of the twelfth century, the village came under the authority of the Count of Provence who gave it as a fief in 1200 to Giraud de Villeneuve. From that date until 1789, members of the Villeneuve family were the Lords of Trans. The seigneurial seat was transformed into a château-fort in the 14th century. From that time the village, decimated by the Black Death, expanded with the cultivation of olives. In 1506, Louis de Villeneuve, seigneur de Trans, received the title of marquis from Louis XII, in recompense for his actions in the Italian Wars.

Population

Air well

In 1931 the Belgian engineer Achille Knapen constructed an experimental air well in Trans-en-Provence. Its purpose was to collect water from the air by condensation, making use of the temperature difference between night and day. It resembles a beehive, and was designed for use in deserts. It was listed as a historic monument in 1983.

See also
Communes of the Var department
Trans-en-Provence Case

References

Communes of Var (department)